Sean Miyashiro is an American founder and CEO of Asian-American music company 88rising.

Career

In 2015, Miyashiro founded American music company 88rising.

He helped produce the soundtrack for American superhero film Shang-Chi and the Legend of the Ten Rings.

References

American people of Japanese descent
Living people
American record producers
American business executives
American mass media company founders
American music industry executives
Year of birth missing (living people)